The 1964 Class A First Group was the 26th season of the Soviet football championship at top division and the 15th for Class A. The season started on 27 March 1964 and finished on 8 November 1964. Upon conclusion of the regular season, at the end of November in warmer Tashkent took place additional play-offs for the first place and the 13th place.

 17 teams took part in the league with FC Dinamo Tbilisi winning the championship.
 Volga Gorky and Shinnik Yaroslavl were the newly promoted clubs.
 According to the rules, if two teams had the equal number of points the winner was decided by the final match between them. The game between Dinamo and Torpedo took place in Tashkent, Uzbekistan SSR with FC Dinamo Tbilisi winning 4-1 after extra time.
 FC Dynamo Kyiv qualified for CWC 1965–66 by beating Krylya Sovetov Kuybyshev 1–0 in the national cup this year becoming the first Soviet football club in European competitions.
 The defending champions Dynamo Moscow placed seventh.

League standings

Results

Top scorers 
16 goals
 Vladimir Fedotov (CSKA)

15 goals
 Viktor Kanevskyi (Dinamo Kiev)

14 goals
 Valentin Ivanov (Torpedo Moscow)

13 goals
 Ilya Datunashvili (Dinamo Tbilisi)

12 goals
 Slava Metreveli (Dinamo Tbilisi)

10 goals
 Oleg Kopayev (SKA Rostov-on-Don)
 Eduard Malofeyev (Dinamo Minsk)
 Viktor Ponedelnik (SKA Rostov-on-Don)
 Oleg Sergeyev (Torpedo Moscow)

9 goals
 Yuri Ananchenko (Shakhtyor)
 Vladimir Barkaya (Dinamo Tbilisi)
 Igor Chislenko (Dynamo Moscow)
 Valeryan Chkhartishvili (Torpedo Kutaisi)
 Boris Kazakov (CSKA)

References 

 Soviet Union - List of final tables (RSSSF)

Soviet Top League seasons
1
Soviet
Soviet